Else Regensteiner (April 21, 1906 – January 18, 2003) was a German weaver, textile designer, writer, and teacher who was primarily based in Chicago, Illinois. She is known for founding and heading the Weaving Department at the School of the Art Institute of Chicago and for the creation of the reg/wick Hand Woven Originals weaving studio with Julia McVickers.

Personal life and education 
Else Regensteiner was born in Munich, Germany, on April 21, 1906, to Ludwig and Hilda Friedsam. She studied at the Deutsche Frauenschule in Munich and received a teaching degree in 1925. In 1926 she married Bertold Regensteiner and her only child, Helga Regensteiner was born in 1928. In 1936, Else and her husband immigrated to the United States. In Chicago, Else was introduced to Marli Ehrman, the head of the weaving department at the School of Design in Chicago. Ehrman offered Else a job as her assistant, and Else accepted the offer but chose to take classes instead of a salary. From 1940 to 1941, Marli Ehrman, a graduate of the Bauhaus, taught Else drafting and weaving on a fly-shuttle loom and introduced her to the ideals of the Bauhaus movement. Following Ehrman's advice, Else went to Black Mountain College in 1942 to take weaving classes under Anni Albers and design classes taught by Joseph Albers.

Career

Teaching 
In 1942, upon her return to Chicago from Black Mountain College, Else Regensteiner began her career as an instructor, teaching weaving at the Jane Addams Hull House until 1945. That year, she taught evening classes at the Chicago Institute of Design at the request of Marli Ehrman, and was hired as an assistant professor in the art department of the School of the Art Institute of Chicago. In 1947 she was made a full professor at the school, and in 1957 she founded its Weaving Department. She was the head of this department until her retirement in 1971 when she was granted the title of professor emeritus. After her retirement, Else became a weaving and design consultant at the American Farm School in Thessaloniki, Greece until 1978. During her career as a teacher, Else travelled throughout the United States and Canada giving workshops and lectures on weaving.

reg/wick Hand Woven Originals 
In 1945, Else Regensteiner partnered with Julia Woodruff Von Bergen McVicker to form reg/wick Hand Woven Originals weaving studio. The studio provided custom ordered handwoven fabrics to architects and interior designers, and designed sample weavings as prototypes for industrial production lines. The studio's fabrics were featured in many exhibitions and won national design awards.

Books 
Else wrote several successful books on the subject of weaving including, The Art of Weaving (1970), Program for a Weaving Study Group (1974),  Weaver's Study Course: Sourcebook for Ideas and Techniques (1982), and Geometric Design in Weaving (1986).

Death 
Else Regensteiner died on January 18, 2003, of heart failure in her Chicago home.

References 

1906 births
2003 deaths
American weavers
20th-century women textile artists
20th-century textile artists
20th-century German women writers
German emigrants to the United States